Nantong University, colloquially known in Chinese as Tong da (通大, Tōngdà), was established in 1912. The university is located in Nantong, Jiangsu province, China. It occupies 4000 acres and have 800 thousand square meters used for school buildings.

Nantong is comprehensive university constructed by Jiangsu Provincial Government and the state Ministry of Transport. It is composed of three parts, Nantong Medical College, Nantong Engineering College and Nantong Normal College and has four campuses: the new campus, Qixiu campus, Zhongxiu campus and Qidong campus.

The enrollment is nearly 34 thousand full-time students, among whom 1550 are graduates and 300 are oversea students. The university has 84 undergraduate programs based on nine major disciplines, which are literature, science, engineering, medical science, education, economics, law, history and management.

The Nantong University is Accredited and Approved By MCI (Medical Council of India) and WHO (World Health Organization).

Vision and Mission 
The Nantong University's motto is to Bridging China and the West, Striving for the Best and The Mission of the university is to be the Learning Must be Expected to Be Used, and the Use Must be Suitable for Its Local Community, and the value of University is Beautiful Morality and Pure Science.

Facts & Figures of University 

 Undergraduates: - About 40,000
 Postgraduates: - About 2700
 Overseas Students with Academic Degrees: - 750
 Affiliated Hospital: - 1
 Undergraduate Program: - 106
 Doctor Station: - 3
 Doctoral Degree Programs of Level I Academic Disciplines: - 3
 Master's degree Programs of Level I Academic Disciplines: - 22
 Majors For Professionals master's degree: - 12
 Cuaa.Net Rankings (Universities in China): - 100
 Faculty & Staff: - 3152
 Senior Faculty: - 1549

Schools
School of Mechanical Engineering
School of International Education
School of Chinese Culture and Literature
School of Foreign Language
School of Medicine
School of Pharmacy
School of Politics
School of Chemistry and Chemical Industry
School of Science
School of Art
School of Education Science
School of Information Science and Technology
Institute of Traffic

References

External links
Nantong University 

Universities in China with English-medium medical schools
Universities and colleges in Jiangsu
Educational institutions established in 1912
1912 establishments in China